Park House may refer to:

in Canada
 Park House Museum, Amherstburg, Ontario

in the United Kingdom
 Park House, Cardiff, Wales
 Park House, Chester, England
 Park House, Mells, Somerset
 Park House (Blaby), Leicestershire

in the United States
(by state)
William Park House, Sprague, Connecticut, listed on the National Register of Historic Places (NRHP) in New London County
David Park House, Bemidji, Minnesota, listed on the NRHP in Beltrami County
 Park House (New York), Manhattan
Jonathan Park House, Worthington, Ohio, listed on the NRHP in Franklin County
James Park House, Knoxville, Tennessee, NRHP-listed
Park-McCullough House, North Bennington, Vermont, NRHP-listed

See also 
 Parkhouse (disambiguation)
 Park House Hotel, Iowa City
 Park House Outbuildings, Stackpole, Wales
 Park House School, Newbury, Berkshire
 Park House English School, Doha, Qatar